Eddy Rousseau is a Tahitian professional football manager.

Career
Since 1997 until 1998 he coached the Tahiti national football team together with Alain Rousseau.

References

Year of birth missing (living people)
Living people
French Polynesian football managers
Tahiti national football team managers
Place of birth missing (living people)